Imaan Hadchiti is an Australian comedian and actor of Lebanese descent. Born in Mylor, South Australia, Hadchiti and his sister Rima Hadchiti are the only two known cases of "Rima Syndrome", a genetic condition causing small stature yet retaining normal proportions. Starting his stand-up career at the age of 15, he won Triple J's Class Clown comedy contest in 2005, and has since performed on The NRL Footy Show, the Adelaide Fringe Festival and the Melbourne International Comedy Festival.

Hadchiti's first television role was a possum in the cult SBS series Wilfred.

Hadchiti has his name in Guinness Book of World Records for being the shortest full-time stand-up comedian.

In 2019 he has participated in "Battute?" an italian comedy show created by RAI

In January 2012, he joined the cast of series 2 of Balls of Steel Australia where he stars as the "Short Tempered", reprising his comedic role.

He also performed at Edinburgh Fringe Festival 2019.

In 2022 he played the part of a Mayan God in Thor: Love and Thunder.

References

Australian people of Lebanese descent
Actors with dwarfism
Australian male comedians
Male actors from South Australia
Year of birth missing (living people)
Living people